Eumecia johnstoni is a species of skink found in Malawi. It is only known from the holotype collected in 1896 from Nyika Plateau, perhaps from Livingstonia. It is named after Harry Hamilton Johnston.

References

Eumecia
Skinks of Africa
Reptiles of Malawi
Endemic fauna of Malawi
Reptiles described in 1897
Taxa named by George Albert Boulenger